Mister X in Canada was a Canadian historical television series which aired on CBC Television in 1960.

Premise
Host Carter B. Store, who worked at the Ottawa School Board as an inspector, created drawings to accompany his discussion of historic Canadian people.

Scheduling
This 15-minute series was broadcast on Mondays at 4:45 p.m. from 4 April to 13 June 1960.

References

CBC Television original programming
1960 Canadian television series debuts
1960 Canadian television series endings